{{DISPLAYTITLE:C15H12O5}}
The chemical formula C15H12O5 (molar mass : 272.25 g/mol, exact Mass 272.068473 u) may refer to :
 Butein, a chalcone
 Butin (molecule), a flavanone
 Garbanzol, a flavanonol
 Glycinol (pterocarpan)
 Griseoxanthone C, a xanthone
 Naringenin, a flavanone
 Naringenin chalcone, a chalcone
 Pinobanksin, a dihydroflavonol
 Thunberginol C, an isocoumarin
 Thunberginol G, an isocoumarin